"Memory I Don't Mess With" is a song by American country music singer Lee Brice. It was released on October 15, 2020, as the second single from his fifth studio album Hey World. Brice wrote the song with Billy Montana and Brian Davis, and it was produced by Ben Glover and Kyle Jacobs.

Background
Brice told PopCulture.com that he wanted to put out something rocking to get people ready to come back to shows.

Brice stated that the song is "about exactly what it says. It's one of those memories, it's one of those things that you can't let yourself get too close to because it just pulls you in too deep, the memory's always there. The pictures are always there in your head. But that's the one you've gotta let alone, and let just be a memory."

Music video
The music video was released on November 3, 2020. It depicts a young couple's love story.

Charts

Weekly charts

Year-end charts

Certifications

References

2020 singles
2020 songs
Lee Brice songs
Songs written by Lee Brice
Songs written by Billy Montana
Curb Records singles